Raritan Landing is a historical unincorporated community located within Piscataway Township in Middlesex County, New Jersey, United States, which was once an inland port, the farthest upstream point ocean-going ships could reach along the Raritan River, across from New Brunswick. Begun in the early 18th century it remained vital until the mid 19th century, when most of the port was abandoned.

The remains of the community now reside buried beneath Johnson Park on the south side of River Road, Remnants of the era, mostly the bluff overlooking the Raritan, include the Cornelius Low House,  Metlar-Bodine House, and the Road Up Raritan Historic District and an archeological site. The nearby East Jersey Olde Towne Village is home to a permanent exhibition about the Raritan Landing.

History
Raritan Landing emerged as a vital port community during the 1720s.  It was situated at the farthest inland point on the Raritan River that could be navigated by merchant ships of the day.  In its heyday, the Landing was the center for local trade and, along with New Brunswick, served as a hub for imports and exports to and from the Raritan Valley.  Agricultural goods and lumber brought to Raritan Landing from throughout central New Jersey were stored in warehouses here, awaiting shipment to either New York or sometimes the Caribbean.  Imported goods were off-loaded and taken by traders to stores and merchants throughout the area.  The majority of the community existed between present-day River Road and the Raritan River, near the intersection of Landing Lane and River Road.  By the 1740s, there were approximately 70 structures and more than 100 inhabitants.

By the early days of the American Revolution the community was occupied by British troops.  The bluffs provided safe haven for the troops, and an unobstructed lookout toward New Brunswick, enabling clear views of approaching Patriot forces.

Timeline
: Raritan Landing community first occupied.
: Edward Antill House is built.
1740: Raritan Landing community included 70 structures and more than 100 inhabitants.
1741: Cornelius Low House is built.
1825: Landing Lane was lined with blacksmith shops, cooper shops, stores and warehouses.
1830: Construction of Delaware and Raritan Canal begins.
1834: Delaware and Raritan Canal completed.
1870: Most of the community is dismantled and converted to pastureland.
1936: Cornelius C. Vermeule, a Piscataway resident, creates a map of Raritan Landing based on his research. The numbers on the map correspond to houses and are keyed to a list of owners included in an article published in the Proceedings of the New Jersey Historical Society. His publication draws others into researching the history of the area. Some of the Vermeule designations are later updated with wills, deeds, newspaper reports, and other paper record.
1970s: Cornelius Low House, Metlar-Bodine House, and Road Up Raritan Historic District are added to the New Jersey Register of Historic Places and the National Register of Historic Places

Raritan Landing Archeological Site

The Raritan Landing Archeological Site includes the Upper Van Rants House Site, the Bluff Prehistoric Site, and areas just downriver in what has become today's Highland Park as well as in Johnson Park. The site was originally listed in 1979 and expanded in 1984. Work was begun by Rutgers University in 1979 and was continued under the auspices of the New Jersey Department of Transportation as part of the planned extension of Route 18, planned for completion in 2012.

Residents
Margaret DeGroot and Benjamin Field
Jeremiah Fieldbutt
Lena Suydam and George Boice
 Peter Levis Boice
Abraham Van Ranst
Isaac Wilson
Edward Antill, merchant
Catherine LaBoyteaux and John Bodine, trader
Jean Blair
Daniel and John Bray
John Castner
William Dugdale, merchant
Effie Hardenbrook and Evert Duyckinck, trader
Adolphus Hardenbrook, merchant
Duncan Hutchison, physician
John Neilson, physician and his son, Colonel John Neilson
Bernardus LaGrange, merchant
Elizabeth Henry and Paul LaBoyteaux (1699-after 1766)
Gabriel LaBoyteaux
 Cornelius Low I (1691–1783), merchant
Isaac Smalley
Catheryntje and Johannes TenBrook, merchant

See also
List of the oldest buildings in New Jersey
National Register of Historic Places listings in Middlesex County, New Jersey
East Jersey Old Town Village
Six Mile Run
New Bridge Landing

References

External links
 

Ghost towns in New Jersey
Unincorporated communities in Middlesex County, New Jersey
Unincorporated communities in New Jersey
Archaeological sites on the National Register of Historic Places in New Jersey
Historic districts on the National Register of Historic Places in New Jersey
Piscataway, New Jersey
Pre-statehood history of New Jersey
Archaeological sites in New Jersey
National Register of Historic Places in Middlesex County, New Jersey
Ports and harbors of New Jersey
New Jersey Register of Historic Places
1720s establishments in New Jersey